Xiepu Road is a station that is part of Line 14 of the Shanghai Metro. Located at the intersection of Luoshan Road and Pudong Avenue in Pudong, the station opened with the rest of Line 14 on December 30, 2021. The station is located on the south side of the Yangpu Bridge. The name of the station comes from Xiepu Road, the road parallel to Luoshan Road.

References 

Railway stations in Shanghai
Shanghai Metro stations in Pudong
Line 14, Shanghai Metro
Railway stations in China opened in 2021